Michaela Suzanne Watkins is an American actress and comedian. Watkins first achieved widespread attention for her brief stint as a featured player on the NBC sketch comedy series Saturday Night Live during its 34th season between 2008 and 2009. Since leaving SNL, she has starred on the Hulu series Casual and on the short-lived sitcoms The Unicorn and Trophy Wife. Watkins has also had recurring roles on other television series, such as The New Adventures of Old Christine, Catastrophe, Enlightened and Search Party and appeared in films such as The Back-up Plan (2010), Wanderlust (2012), Enough Said (2013) and Sword of Trust (2019).

Early life
Watkins was born in Syracuse, New York, the daughter of former Latin teacher mother Myrna Watkins and Syracuse University mathematician father Mark Watkins. She has two sisters, Rebecca Kent and Sarah Fitts.

Watkins was raised in DeWitt, New York, a suburb of Syracuse, in a Jewish family. After her parents' divorce, Watkins' mother obtained a marketing degree and relocated the family to Boston when Watkins was 15.

Watkins attended Moses DeWitt Elementary School and Wellesley High School in Wellesley, Massachusetts. She graduated from Boston University, where she studied theater and acting. Watkins auditioned for a part in a British farce at a community theater when she was 15, and got the part. Joan Rivers was one of her inspirations to go into show business.

Career

Theater
After theater school, Watkins lived and worked in New York City for a year but struggled to build her career. She moved with a friend to Portland, Oregon. She lived there from 1996–2000 and appeared onstage with Portland Center Stage and the defunct improv group Toad City Productions. She traveled around the country doing regional theater, then decided to move to Los Angeles.

She was active in Los Angeles Theatre for many years, taking on roles with Circle X Theatre and 2100 Square Feet.

Regional theater
 Portland Center Stage: Hamlet (1999), Rosencrantz & Guildenstern are Dead (1999), Bus Stop (2000)
 Portland Repertory Theatre: Arcadia
 Artist Repertory Theatre: The Misanthrope, How I Learned To Drive as well as Merchant of Venice, The Winter's Tale
 triangle productions: Angels in America, The Food Chain
 Circle X Theatre: Laura Comstock's Bag Punching Dog (2002) - LA Weekly award, Sperm (2004)
 Vineyard Playhouse: Fighting Words by Sunil Kuruvilla (2003)

Improv
She became a regular performer at The Groundlings, where she was discovered by Saturday Night Live. Watkins said the appeal of sketch work is that she can write her own material.

TV

Saturday Night Live
In November 2008, Watkins joined the cast of Saturday Night Live (SNL). Watkins said (at that time) that she was the oldest woman they ever hired. Watkins has since been surpassed by Leslie Jones, who was 47 when she joined SNL. Watkins made her first major appearance on the show as Arianna Huffington on the November 22nd Weekend Update. Watkins remained on SNL as a featured player throughout the rest of the 2008-2009 season, up to the season finale on May 16, 2009.

However, while SNL was on summer hiatus, the news broke in early September 2009 that Watkins, along with fellow castmate Casey Wilson, were both to be let go from the show and would not be returning for the 2009-10 season.

Recurring characters on SNL
 Angie Tempura: A geeky, iced coffee-drinking computer nerd who snarks on celebrities and movies and is the creator of the snarky website "Bitch Pleeze" (www.bitchpleeze.com, which redirects to the SNL site). Though she insults celebrities, Angie was revealed to have a crush on Zac Efron.

Later TV credits
She recurred as Lucy opposite Hamish Linklater in the sitcom The New Adventures of Old Christine, as well as appearing in recurring roles in the comedy programs Enlightened, New Girl, and Anger Management. She has also made guest appearances on shows such as Hung, Childrens Hospital, Kroll Show, Key & Peele, Curb Your Enthusiasm, and Modern Family.

Watkins also starred alongside Malin Åkerman, Bradley Whitford, and Marcia Gay Harden in the short-lived, but well-received ABC sitcom Trophy Wife. The series aired for one season from September 2013 to May 2014.

In 2015, it was announced that Watkins would star in the Hulu series produced by Jason Reitman called Casual, which would be executive produced by Liz Tigelaar.

In 2018, she recurred on season two of the Amazon Prime series Catastrophe, playing the sister of lead character Rob Norris (Rob Delaney). From 2019 to 2021, she has co-starred on the CBS sitcom The Unicorn.

Producing, writing
Watkins co-created (with writing partner and fellow Groundling, Damon Jones) the short-lived 2014 USA Network comedy series Benched. The series starred Eliza Coupe and Jay Harrington and premiered on October 28, 2014. Watkins and Jones were also executive producers on the show.

Film
Watkins has appeared in supporting roles in films such as Enough Said, In a World..., Afternoon Delight, The Back-Up Plan, Wanderlust, They Came Together and Lazy Eye.

Podcasts
In 2020, Watkins appeared in the supporting role of Irene O'Connor in the musical podcast In Strange Woods.

Personal life
Watkins is married to Fred Kramer, who is a founding partner of Reason Ventures and General Manager of Critical Mass Studios, Inc. Kramer used to be Executive Director of the Jewish World Watch organization, a Los Angeles-based anti-genocide non-profit, focused on the situations in Sudan and Congo.

Filmography

Film

Television

Podcasts

References

External links

 

Living people
21st-century American actresses
20th-century American actresses
Actresses from Massachusetts
American film actresses
American television actresses
American voice actresses
American television writers
Television producers from New York (state)
American women television producers
American women comedians
Boston University College of Fine Arts alumni
Jewish American actresses
Jewish American female comedians
Actresses from Syracuse, New York
People from Wellesley, Massachusetts
American women television writers
Showrunners
American impressionists (entertainers)
American sketch comedians
Comedians from New York (state)
Comedians from Massachusetts
Wellesley High School alumni
Screenwriters from Massachusetts
Screenwriters from New York (state)
20th-century American comedians
21st-century American comedians
21st-century American Jews
Year of birth missing (living people)